Roberto Piazza (born 29 January 1968) is an Italian professional volleyball coach and former player. He is the current head coach of the Netherlands national team and Allianz Milano.

Honours

As a player
 CEV Cup
  1987/1988 – with Maxicono Parma
  1988/1989 – with Maxicono Parma

As a coach
 CEV Champions League
  2012/2013 – with Bre Banca Lannutti Cuneo

 CEV Cup
  2010/2011 – with Sisley Treviso

 CEV Challenge Cup
  2020/2021 – with Allianz Powervolley Milano

 National championships
 2015/2016  Greek Cup, with Olympiacos Piraeus
 2016/2017  Italian SuperCup, with Azimut Modena
 2017/2018  Polish SuperCup, with PGE Skra Bełchatów
 2017/2018  Polish Championship, with PGE Skra Bełchatów
 2018/2019  Polish SuperCup, with PGE Skra Bełchatów

References

External links
 
 Coach profile at LegaVolley.it 
 Player profile at LegaVolley.it 
 Coach/Player profile at Volleybox.net

1968 births
Living people
Sportspeople from Parma
Italian volleyball coaches
Volleyball coaches of international teams
Italian expatriate sportspeople in Russia
Italian expatriate sportspeople in Poland
Italian expatriate sportspeople in Greece
Italian expatriate sportspeople in Qatar
Italian expatriate sportspeople in the Netherlands
Jastrzębski Węgiel coaches
Skra Bełchatów coaches